Ray Tintori is an American director, screenwriter and founding member of Court 13, the filmmaking collective behind Beasts of the Southern Wild. He has directed three short films, as well as several music videos for bands, such as MGMT, Chairlift, The Cool Kids, The Killers, Arcade Fire, and Solange.

Personal life
Tintori graduated from Wesleyan University in 2006, where he studied film, and from LaGuardia High School in Manhattan in 2001, where he was a studio art major. His father is John Tintori, a film editor and Chair of NYU's Kanbar Institute of Film & Television and his mother is Mary Cybulski, a script supervisor.

Works
Tintori's first two short films were heavily narrated, black & white, fantasy stories featuring numerous whimsical characters. His directorial debut was the 2005 short film Jettison Your Loved Ones, which screened at the 2006 Slamdance Film Festival. New York magazine referred to the film as "a deranged, no-budget sci-fi epic [...] some of the most hypnotic and strange six minutes you’ll ever spend staring at a computer screen." His senior thesis film Death to the Tinman premiered at the 2007 Sundance Film Festival where it won a short filmmaking award.

Tintori directed the music video for the MGMT's single "Time to Pretend". The video garnered attention on MTVu airwaves due to its colorful, psychedelic style. Tintori also directed the videos for MGMT's second and third singles, "Electric Feel" and "Kids", respectively. He also directed the videos for The Killers' song "Spaceman" and "Chairlift's "Evident Utensil", which was nominated for an award in the "Breakthrough Video" category at the 2009 MTV Video Music Awards.

In July, 2009, Spike Jonze announced that Tintori would be directing Light Boxes, an adaptation of the novel by Shane Jones. However, in May 2010, Jonze stated that Tintori was no longer working on the project,  and in June 2010, Shane Jones said the film option had been dropped.

In May, 2010, the Brooklyn Arts Council honored Tintori with a "premature retrospective", screening a number of his short films and other works.

Tintori worked on Court 13's first feature film Beasts of the Southern Wild as Aurochs and Special Effects Unit Director.

Tintori participated in the Sundance Institute's 2013 June Screenwriters Lab with his Untitled Cabal Project, and his short film Cabal screened at the 2014 Borscht Film Festival.

Tintori worked on Approaching the Unknown as Practical SFX Unit Director. Pre-production and filming of the effects sequences took place under the mentorship of Douglas Trumbull at Trumbull Studios in the Berkshire Mountains.

In 2016, Tintori directed a trailer video for Google's Tilt Brush.

In 2017, Tintori won a Sports Emmy for his work with Oculus on Follow My Lead: The Story of the 2016 NBA Finals starring Steph Curry, LeBron James and narrated by Michael B. Jordan.

In 2018, Tintori directed the ULP Orientation Video in the "Windmills" episode of Maniac.

Filmography

Music videos
 "Electric Feel" by MGMT (2007) (Interactive video)
 "Time to Pretend" by MGMT (2008)
 "Electric Feel" by MGMT (2008)
 "Delivery Man" by The Cool Kids (2008)
 "Spaceman" by The Killers (2009)
 "Evident Utensil" by Chairlift (2009)
 "Kids" by MGMT (2009)
 "Dressed to Digress" by Boy Crisis (2009)
 "Crystallize" (YouTube Music Awards version) by Lindsay Stirling (2013)
 "Chemistry" by Arcade Fire (2018)

Short films
 Jettison Your Loved Ones (2005)
 Death to the Tinman (2006)
 Cabal (2014)

References

External links
 Ray Tintori official site
 
 Ray Tintori on Clipland
 Jettison Your Loved Ones Video
 Death to the Tinman Video
 Partizan representation for commercials and music videos.

Year of birth missing (living people)
Living people
Wesleyan University alumni
American music video directors
Fiorello H. LaGuardia High School alumni
Film directors from New York City